William Alexander Ross (15 November 1913 – 28 September 1942) was a Scottish international rugby union player, who was killed in World War II.

He also played for Hillhead RFC.

See also
 List of Scottish rugby union players killed in World War II

Sources
 Bath, Richard (ed.) The Scotland Rugby Miscellany (Vision Sports Publishing Ltd, 2007 )
 Massie, Allan A Portrait of Scottish Rugby (Polygon, Edinburgh)

References

External links
 Player profile on scrum.com
 CWGC entry

1913 births
1942 deaths
Scottish military personnel
Scottish rugby union players
Scotland international rugby union players
Royal Air Force personnel killed in World War II
Hillhead RFC players
Royal Air Force airmen
Royal Air Force Volunteer Reserve personnel of World War II